Mario Pizziolo (8 December 1909 – 30 April 1990) was an Italian football player and manager, who played as a central or defensive midfielder.

Club career
Pizziolo was born in Castellammare Adriatico, province of Pescara. He started his club career in the youth teams of Livorno and Ternana, and later played for the Pistoiese senior side (1925–1929), before joining the senior team of Fiorentina, where he played between 1929 and 1936, playing 203 matches and scoring three goals in all competitions.

He retired at 27.

International career
Pizziolo played twelve matches for Italy between 1933 and 1934, scoring one goal. He was part of the gold-winning 1933–35 Central European International Cup squad, and of the side that won the 1934 FIFA World Cup on home soil, in which he played one game, the first leg of the quarter-finals against Spain, in which he got seriously injured, breaking one of his legs, in a 1–1 draw after extra-time. He would not play for Italy again. As Pizziolo could not play any of the other games or the final match for Italy, he was not awarded a medal for his performance until 1988, two years before he died, in Florence, at the age of 80.

Honours

Player

Club
Fiorentina
Serie B: 1930–31

International
Italy
FIFA World Cup: 1934
Central European International Cup: 1933–35

Manager
Pescara
Serie C: 1940–41

Individual
ACF Fiorentina Hall of Fame: 2012

Notes

References

Bibliography

External links
  Mario Pizziolo at FIGC.it
  Mario Pizziolo at Enciclopediadelcalcio.it
 
 

1909 births
1990 deaths
Sportspeople from the Province of Pescara
Italian footballers
Italy international footballers
Association football midfielders
Serie A players
Serie B players
U.S. Livorno 1915 players
Ternana Calcio players
ACF Fiorentina players
1934 FIFA World Cup players
FIFA World Cup-winning players
U.S. Pistoiese 1921 players
Delfino Pescara 1936 managers
Italian football managers
Footballers from Abruzzo